Chiliadenus bocconei is a species of plant in the family Asteraceae. It is endemic to Malta.

References

Sources

bocconei
Endemic biota of Europe
Plants described in 1979
Taxa named by Salvatore Brullo
Flora of Malta